is a Japanese television drama. It premiered in 2005 and was broadcast by Fuji Television, and ran for 10 episodes. It boasted the acclaimed actress Misaki Ito as one of the primary roles.

The ending theme is the song "Pop Star" by Ken Hirai.

Summary
Minagawa Yutaro's life has always followed a straight and narrow path, while his sister, Minagawa Hiroko, has only her looks to get her by. However, Yutaro's begins to unravel after his sister moves in. What he doesn't realize is that while he was studying to pass the entrance examinations for a prestigious medical school, his father's sake business, the Minagawa Brewery, was slowly going bankrupt and was forced to take a ¥6,000,000 loan. How will Hiroko tackle this loan? What is the fate of the Minagawa Brewery? Will it all work out itself out, as things always have in Hiroko's favor, or will her dreams fail?

Cast
 Misaki Ito as Hiroko Minagawa
 Mirai Moriyama as Yūtarō Minagawa
 Ken Utsui a Gentarō Minagawa
 Yumiko Shaku as Saori Kitamura
 Nana Eikura as Ai Tamura
 Yūta Hiraoka as Takumi Nakamura
 Masanobu Takashima as Ikuo Takeda

References

External links
  
 

Japanese drama television series
2005 Japanese television series debuts
2005 Japanese television series endings
2005 in Japanese television
Fuji TV dramas